Laajasalo is a group of islands that forms a Southeast Helsinki's neighbourhood in southern Helsinki, the capital of Finland. As of 2018, it had a population of 18 876.

References

Islands of Helsinki
Neighbourhoods of Helsinki
Islands of Uusimaa